Ralph George McInerney (December 14, 1897 – July 26, 1953) was a lawyer, insurance broker and political figure in New Brunswick, Canada. He represented the city of Saint John in the Legislative Assembly of New Brunswick from 1939 to 1948 as a Conservative member.

He was born in Richibucto, the son of George Valentine McInerney and Christina O'Leary, both of Irish descent. He was educated in Chatham and at Saint Dunstan's University. During World War I, he served as a lieutenant in the Canadian Expeditionary Force and then as a pilot in the Royal Flying Corps. McInerney was called to the Bar of New Brunswick in 1924. In 1930, he married Kathleen C. Coster. He died in 1953 at the age of 55.

References 

 Canadian Parliamentary Guide, 1948, PG Normandin

1897 births
1953 deaths
20th-century Canadian politicians
20th-century Canadian lawyers
Canadian Expeditionary Force officers
Royal Flying Corps officers
Progressive Conservative Party of New Brunswick MLAs
Saint Dunstan's University alumni
People from Kent County, New Brunswick
British Army personnel of World War I